Basilio José Segundo "Basil" Pica Valdés (10 July 1892 – 26 January 1970) was a Filipino doctor, general and minister. Valdes was chief of staff of the Armed Forces of the Commonwealth of the Philippines from 1939, and was in 1941 appointed Secretary of National Defense by President Manuel L. Quezon. After the Japanese invasion of the Philippines at the beginning of the Second World War, he was one of the members of Quezon's war cabinet in exile.

Early life and career
Basilio Valdés was born on 10 July 1892 in San Miguel, Manila, in the Captaincy General of the Philippines as the third child of a family of four. His parents were the Filomena Pica and the Benito Salvador Valdés, a doctor and former classmate of José Rizal in Madrid. His mother later died in 1897 after giving birth to the couple's fifth son, after which the family led a wandering existence. Because of this, the young Valdes studied in many different schools. La Salle College, Barcelona (1897–1901); San Beda University, Manila (1901–1903); La Salle College, Hong Kong (1903–1904); the American School in Manila (1904); Pagsanjan High School (1905–1908); Manila High School (1908–1911); and on his father's intercession, he opted for a study of medicine at the Faculty of Medicine and Surgery, University of Santo Tomas (1911–1916) after completing his secondary school education.

Volunteer to France
After graduating in 1916 he worked briefly as a lecturer, but with the ongoing First World War he decided to leave the same year for France and joined the French Army as medical volunteer. He worked in the military hospital as a surgeon for the French Red Cross. With the American entry into the war in 1917, he transferred to the US Army (the Philippines being a US colony at the time) and continued to work until 1919. In February that year, he was appointed a member of the Military Inter-Allied Commission to Germany; made chief of the Medical Service of the American Red Cross Commission to Germany and later made deputy commissioner of the American Red Cross in Europe. In this position he made studies of health conditions in Prague, Czechoslovakia and Kovno, Lithuania. After the war he ran a clinic in Manila and married Rosario Legarda Roces, whom he adopted a daughter with.

Military service and Secretary of Defense
In 1922 he was asked to join the Philippine Constabulary and revitalize their medical services; he joined and had by 1926 been promoted to lieutenant colonel and chief surgeon, serving as medical inspector from 1926 to 1934. Valdes became brigadier general and chief of the Constabulary in 1934. He later took his oath of office as Deputy Chief of Staff of the Philippine Army on May 4, 1936, and with the retirement of Chief of Staff General Paulino Santos, Valdes assumed this office by presidential appointment on January 1, 1939.

With the growing threat of Japanese expansion during the 1930s, President Manuel L. Quezon established the Department of National Defense in November, 1939, which had executive authority over the army. With the attack on Pearl Harbor and Japanese invasion of the Philippines in December, 1941, President Quezon merged the departments of National Defense, Public Works, Communications and Labor into a single department and appointed Valdes as secretary on 23 December.
As a member of the War Cabinet, he was tasked by General Douglas MacArthur to be in charge of the safety of President Quezon, who was very ill by that time, and his family. They were all evacuated to Corregidor, then Australia, and finally to the United States, creating the Commonwealth government-in-exile. After the death of Quezon on August 1, 1944, Valdes continued to serve in President Sergio Osmeña's government with the same positions as before. When American troops invaded the occupied Philippines in the Second Philippine Campaign, Valdes returned together with MacArthur and President Osmeña in the landing on Red Beach, Leyte on October 20, 1944.

Valdes reentered Manila on February 6, 1945, and was reunited with his family after three years of separation. Later the same month, the Commonwealth of the Philippines was reestablished and President Osmeña appointed Valdes as ad interim Secretary of Public Health and Welfare, officially taking the position on June 27, 1945. In this position he organized relief goods and medicine distributions from the U.S. Medical Corps to the war torn country. He retired from government service on July 4 the same year.

Valdes received one of 20 original facsimiles of the Instrument of Surrender, being one of eight personal guests of MacArthur, and his document is currently owned and curated by The International Museum of World War II in Natick, Massachusetts.

In January 1946 Valdes was appointed as one of the judges at the Military Tribunal of Japanese General Masaharu Homma in view of the war crimes committed by his command during the invasion of the Philippines, sitting on the bench along with Leo Donovan, Robert G. Gard, Arthur Trudeau, and Warren H. McNaught.

Later life and death
After the war Valdes went back to teaching as a professor of surgery at the University of Santo Tomas in Manila. He was head of the Philippine Cancer Society, vice-president of the Philippine Tuberculosis Society, chairman of the Deans Committee for the Veterans Memorial Medical Center and became the medical director of Our Lady of Lourdes Hospital from 1948 until his death. Basilio Valdes died on January 26, 1970, and was given a full military funeral.

See also
Manuel L. Quezon
Philippines campaign (1941–1942)
Philippines Campaign (1944–1945)
Filipinos in the French military

Notes

References

External links
Gen. Basilio Valdes, a photo of the Major General Valdes wearing WWI service stripes on his lower left sleeve

Philippine Army generals
Filipino surgeons
Philippine Constabulary personnel
Filipino military personnel of World War II
Philippine Army generals of World War II
Military history of the Philippines
1892 births
1970 deaths
People from San Miguel, Manila
University of Santo Tomas alumni
Filipino people of Cuban descent
Filipino people of Spanish descent
Chairmen of the Joint Chiefs (Philippines)
Secretaries of National Defense of the Philippines
Secretaries of Health of the Philippines
Secretaries of Labor and Employment of the Philippines
Secretaries of Public Works and Highways of the Philippines
Osmeña administration cabinet members
Quezon administration cabinet members
San Beda University alumni
20th-century Filipino medical doctors